Keshish Qeshlaqi (also Romanized as Keshīsh Qeshlāqī; also known as Keshīsh Qeshlāq and Kesh Qeshlāq) is a village in Minjavan-e Sharqi Rural District, Minjavan District, Khoda Afarin County, East Azerbaijan Province, Iran. At the 2006 census, its population was 12, in 5 families.

References 

Populated places in Khoda Afarin County